Ship management is the activity of managing marine vessels. The vessels under management could be owned by a sister concern of the ship management company or by independent vessel owners. 
A vessel owning company that generally has several vessels in its fleet, entrusts the fleet management to a single or multiple ship management companies. Ship management is often entrusted to third parties due to the various hassles that are involved in managing a ship. For instance, ships could be considered as large factories that travel across seas under various weather conditions for several days at a stretch.
These vessels are equipped with several types of machinery that require appropriate maintenance and the associated spares on board. In the scenario of a vessel lacking adequate maintenance, this could lead to the breakdown of the equipment in the middle of a voyage at sea.
A breakdown could be an expensive affair.
A second scenario would be – a vessel is continuously on the move or under some sort of activity and hence requires to be manned by a competent crew. The documents of the crew need to comply with international regulations, their transportation to and from the vessel must be arranged for, their competencies must align with the requirement of the vessel and must complement the skillsets of the existing onboard crew. Hence several parameters must be considered which is a tedious job.  

In order to ensure such scenarios are considered for and to provide adequate attention to the vessels, ship owners outsource the management. Several management companies provide the owner with a crew on board. When the ship comes out of the shipyard (where the ship is built) the management company takes it over providing technical management to the owner. Most Management companies also offer other services like inspection prior to purchase, supervision during building, crew management and supply and ship lay-up solutions.

Major locations where third party ship management activities are carried out from include Limassol (Cyprus), Singapore, Hong Kong and Malta.

In order to help with the management of these vessels, several operators use maritime software such as a planned maintenance system, maritime procurement system or a safety management system to streamline processes and ensure efficiency.

Definition

Ship management is an important part of maritime traffic supervision and management, including the registration and management of ships, visa of ships entering and leaving the port, management of foreign vessels, ship maintenance management and technical ship management.

Ship Manager

Ship managers are companies who accepting the commission of the shipowners or charterers and the ship operator engaged in ship management. This includes the narrow technical management of ships, registration of vessels, operations, service, technical maintenance, as well as management of crew among other. It can also include the business and commercial management of a vessel, such as its chartering and financial administration. As long as companies who comply with the characteristics above, they can classified as a ship manager and their duties are based on the pre-agreed and trust relationship with the ship owners.

Ship Management Information System 

Ship Management Information System is based on the management philosophy which states that "skill management is the basic, security control is the core and the success control is the purpose". In order to satisfy the requirement of classification and to satisfy multiple Ship Equipment Maintenance System and Ship Inspection Management System, there is Ship Machinery Planned Maintenance System, Inspection Guide been set.

Ship Dynamic Management System

The parameters of ships at sea practices, position, speed, heading, weather, sea conditions, the host load, speed, load and auxiliary machinery, oil stocks and ballast water distribution are the main issues cared by the shipowners, operators, managers and charterers. People above is nagged by the problems of gaining the parameters at any time accurately, however with the development of electronic information, satellite communications and computer technology it is more likely to improve the accessibility of them.

Ship Inspection

Purpose
Encourage the ship companies to maintain good technology conditions and to make sure the operational safety and to reduce damage of marine environment, promise the power of controlling and managing of ports state government. Meanwhile, it also improves the competitive of the market with low insurance rates and provides essential evidence for notary, claims and maritime deals.
Types and Organizations
Most of the ship inspection organizations in the world are charged by civil society organizations such as classification. IACS was founded in 1968 it mainly focuses on communicating with each classification using technology supporting the inspection and exploration as well as pursuing international ship maritime safety and protecting the marine environment.
Currently the 13 memberships are [[American Bureau of 
Shipping]] (ABS), Bureau Veritas (BV), China Classification Society (CCS), Croatian Register of Shipping (CRS), Det Norske Veritas (DNV), Germanischer Lloyd (GL), Korean Register of Shipping (KR), Lloyd's Register (LR), Nippon Kaiji Kyokai (NK), Registro Italiano Navale (RINA), Russian Maritime Register of Shipping (RS), Polski Rejester Statkow (PRS), Indian Register of Shipping (IRS).

See also
 List of freight ship companies
 Crew management
 Maritime history
 Technical management
 Shipping companies
 Shipping markets
 Glossary of nautical terms

References

External links

 QHSE - Vessel Incident Management System

 
Management by type